Lake Success can refer to:

Lake Success (California), lake in California
Lake Success, New York, village in New York
Lake Success, a novel by American author Gary Shteyngart